The Pratt Street Power Plant — also known as the Pier Four Power Plant, The Power Plant, "Pratt Street Toenail", and Pratt Street Station — is a historic former power plant located in downtown Baltimore, Maryland, USA. It has undergone significant repurposing development since retirement and was listed on the National Register of Historic Places in 1987.

History

The building and its active years
The structure is a  complex of three buildings located at Pratt Street and Pier 4 at Baltimore's Inner Harbor. The structures are brick with terra cotta trim and steel frame construction.  It was built between 1900 and 1909 and is a massive industrial structure with Neo-Classical detailing designed by the architectural firm of Baldwin & Pennington. It was one of only 11 buildings in the zone of the Baltimore Fire of 1904 to survive that event.

It served as the main source of power for the United Railways and Electric Company, a consolidation of smaller street railway systems, that influenced the provision of citywide transportation and opened up suburban areas of Baltimore to power its electric street railway in the city.  It later served as a central steam plant for the Consolidated Gas, Electric Light and Power Company, a predecessor of the Baltimore Gas and Electric Company.

The boilers were coal-fired, and the plant's location on the harbor allowed easy delivery of coal by ship. The location also provided access to cooling water for the condensers, with intake on one side of the pier and discharge on the other.

The plant, with by-then obsolete equipment, was used sparingly until it was returned to service to meet the World War II production demand for electricity. Baltimore Gas & Electric finally ceased use of it in 1973.

Post-retirement life
After the electric plant was retired from service, the building was vacant several years, eventually becoming acquired by the City of Baltimore. It has since been redeveloped and repurposed for a variety of commercial projects.

The first two attempts at redevelopment - an indoor Six Flags theme park named Six Flags Power Plant (1985–1989) and a short-lived dance club called P.T. Flagg's (1989–1990) - were not successful. Since that time, other projects have had more success. The Power Plant's more recent tenants have included the first ESPN Zone in the country (opened July 11, 1998; closed June 2010 and replaced by Phillips Seafood, which moved from nearby Harborplace), Hard Rock Cafe (opened July 4, 1997), Barnes & Noble (opened 1998, closed August 28, 2020), Gold's Gym (closed early 2010; and replaced by Pandion Performance Center in June 2015), and loft offices. Maryland Art Place, a contemporary art gallery for Maryland artists, is located in the northwest corner. It lends its name to the nearby Power Plant Live! nightlife complex. 

The Cordish Company has its headquarters on the sixth floor. Cordish also developed the adjacent Pier IV building, whose tenants include Dick's Last Resort.

References

External links

Buildings and structures in Baltimore
Inner Harbor, Baltimore
Former coal-fired power stations in the United States
Power stations in Maryland
Towers in Maryland
Energy infrastructure completed in 1909
Energy infrastructure on the National Register of Historic Places
Industrial buildings and structures on the National Register of Historic Places in Baltimore
1909 establishments in Maryland
Exelon
Historic American Engineering Record in Baltimore
Tourist attractions in Baltimore
Adaptive reuse of industrial structures in the United States
Former power stations in Maryland